Country Girl is the memoir of Edna O'Brien. Faber and Faber published it in 2012. The title refers to her debut novel The Country Girls, which was banned, burned and denounced upon publication.

Country Girls cover is a reprint of the photograph used for O'Brien's 1965 novel August Is a Wicked Month.

The Observer said the book "reveal[s] a brave, beautiful and sometimes helpless woman on her journey from repression to creative freedom."

It won in the Irish Non-Fiction Book category at the 2012 Irish Book Awards.

References

External links
 Country Girl by Edna O'Brien – review: The taboo-breaking, the men, the fabulous prose – there's no one like Edna O'Brien; 12 October 2012, Anne Enright, The Guardian
 Country Girl – Edna O'Brien's New Memoir, Sheila Langan, April / May 2013
 The art of becoming Edna O'Brien, 26 April 2013, Charles McNulty, Los Angeles Times

2012 non-fiction books
Irish memoirs
Literary memoirs
Works by Edna O'Brien
Faber and Faber books